is an opera by the French composer Étienne Méhul. It takes the form of a comédie en vers mêlée de musique (an opéra-comique) in two acts. It premiered at the Opéra-Comique in Paris on 5 April 1802. The libretto is by Jean-Nicolas Bouilly. The work was a popular success and enjoyed several revivals, despite some hostile reviews. It was around this time, claimed Bouilly, that Méhul fought a duel with and wounded a journalist who had harshly criticised him.

Roles

Synopsis

Florival is in love with Armantine, the ward of the Italian painter Cerberti. At first he tries to deceive Cerberti by disguising himself as a Flemish art merchant but he is discovered. In the second act, Florival's valet pretends to be the nephew of an old servant of Cerberti's from Picardy. He persuades Cerberti to use Florival as a model for a painting of Bayard alongside Armantine. Florival's identity is betrayed but he is defiant, as is Armantine, who claims she is free to choose who she marries. Cerberti has no choice but to consent.

Arrangements
Louis Spohr wrote his Variations on "Je suis encore dans mon printemps" for harp (Op. 36) based on the aria in Act 1, Scene 2.

References

Sources
Adélaïde de Place Étienne Nicolas Méhul (Bleu Nuit Éditeur, 2005)
Arthur Pougin Méhul: sa vie, son génie, son caractère (Fischbacher, 1889)
General introduction to Méhul's operas in the  introduction to the edition of Stratonice by M. Elizabeth C. Bartlet (Pendragon Press, 1997)
Original printed libretto at the Internet Archive
Printed score at the Internet Archive

Operas by Étienne Méhul
1802 operas
Opéras comiques
French-language operas
Operas